Koshindo may refer to:

 The ancient name of Taejonggyo, a Korean religion

See also (note spelling and pronunciation)
 Koshinto, meaning ancient Shinto)
 A Japanese folk faith Kōshin, or a shrine related to it , e.g.  The Yasaka Kōshin-dō, located in Kyoto, Japan